The 2020 international cricket season took place from May to September 2020. 15 Test matches, 49 One Day Internationals (ODIs) and 40 Twenty20 International (T20Is) were scheduled to be played during this period, as well as 8 Women's One Day Internationals (WODIs) and 9 Women's Twenty20 Internationals (WT20Is). Additionally, a number of other T20I/WT20I matches were also scheduled to be played in minor series involving associate nations. The season started with Australia leading the Test cricket rankings, England leading the ODI rankings and Australia leading the Twenty20 rankings.

The COVID-19 pandemic continued to impact on international cricket fixtures. Bangladesh's matches against Ireland were postponed on 21 March 2020. On 24 March 2020, the International Cricket Council (ICC) confirmed that all ICC qualifying events scheduled to take place before 30 June 2020 had been postponed. On 9 April 2020, Australia's tour to Bangladesh was postponed. On 20 April 2020, South Africa's tour to Sri Lanka was also postponed. On 22 April 2020, the Dutch government announced that it had banned all events in the country, both sports and cultural, until 1 September 2020. Two days later, the England and Wales Cricket Board (ECB) confirmed that no professional cricket would be played in England before 1 July 2020, with tours by the West Indies and India's women both being postponed. On 12 May 2020, the ICC confirmed that the 2020 Women's Cricket World Cup Qualifier, scheduled to take place in Sri Lanka, had also been postponed. The ICC announced that the qualifier had been moved back to 2021. Two days later, Cricket Scotland and Cricket Ireland confirmed the cancellation of summer fixtures, including New Zealand's tour against both sides and Pakistan's visit to Ireland.

June and July saw further disruption to international cricket due to the pandemic. The ICC confirmed that the Scotland Tri-Nation Series and the Uganda Cricket World Cup Challenge League B tournament had both been postponed. The Board of Control for Cricket in India (BCCI) confirmed that it had called off their tours to Zimbabwe and Sri Lanka. Scotland's one-off T20I match against Australia was cancelled, New Zealand's tour to Bangladesh to play two Test matches was postponed, and Bangladesh's tour to Sri Lanka to play three Test matches were all postponed. The latter was later rescheduled to be played in October 2020. On 30 June, Cricket Australia confirmed that their planned home series against Zimbabwe had also been postponed due to the virus. On 8 August 2020, Afghanistan's planned tour to Zimbabwe for five T20I matches was called off. Also in August 2020, the Netherlands tour to Zimbabwe was postponed, and India's tour to South Africa was cancelled due to a clash with the rescheduled 2020 Indian Premier League. Finally, the last scheduled series to be cancelled was the South Africa women's tour to England, which was due to take place in September 2020.

In June 2020, the ICC made several interim changes to the Playing Conditions due to the pandemic. A substitute could be used for any player showing symptoms of COVID-19, but only in a Test match. Players were banned from using saliva to shine the ball, with five penalty runs being awarded to the opposition for repeated transgressions. The requirement to use neutral match officials was temporarily lifted, along with an increase to the number of DRS reviews a team can use, due to having less experienced umpires in a match.

International men's cricket started with the first Test between England and the West Indies on 8 July 2020, with the West Indies winning by four wickets. New Zealand's tour of the West Indies, also scheduled to start on 8 July 2020, was postponed after it clashed with the rescheduling of the West Indies tour of England. South Africa's tour of the West Indies was also postponed due to the rescheduling of the England-West Indies series. Ireland's tour of England, originally scheduled in September, was brought forward to 30 July 2020, after the ECB gave the go ahead for the series. The fixture was also the first match in the 2020–2023 ICC Cricket World Cup Super League tournament, with England beating Ireland by six wickets. The ICC began the use of technology to monitor front-foot no-balls for all matches in the World Cup Super League. The ICC also started to trial the technology for the first time in a Test match, during Pakistan's Test series against England. Australia's tour to England, originally scheduled to take place in July, was moved back to September, following the rearranged series between England and Ireland. The only women's international cricket to take place was a five-match WT20I series between England and the West Indies. England Women won all of the matches, the first time they had won a bilateral series 5–0.

Season overview

Rankings

The following were the rankings at the beginning of the season.

On-going tournaments
The following were the rankings at the beginning of the season.

May

Bangladesh in Ireland and England
The tour was postponed in March 2020 due to the COVID-19 pandemic, and later rescheduled to take place in May 2022.

June

2020 Papua New Guinea Tri-Nation Series

The ODI series was postponed in March 2020 due to the COVID-19 pandemic.

New Zealand in Scotland
The tour was postponed in May 2020 due to the COVID-19 pandemic.

Australia in Bangladesh

The tour was postponed in April 2020 due to the COVID-19 pandemic.

New Zealand in the Netherlands

The match was postponed in April 2020 due to the COVID-19 pandemic.

2020 Netherlands Quadrangular Series

The series was postponed in April 2020 due to the COVID-19 pandemic.

New Zealand in Ireland
The tour was postponed in May 2020 due to the COVID-19 pandemic.

India women in England
The tour was postponed in April 2020 due to the COVID-19 pandemic.

South Africa in Sri Lanka
The tour was postponed in April 2020 due to the COVID-19 pandemic. It was rescheduled in July 2021, to take place in September 2021.

Australia in Scotland

The match was cancelled in June 2020 due to the COVID-19 pandemic.

July

Pakistan in the Netherlands
The tour was postponed in April 2020 due to the COVID-19 pandemic.

2020 Scotland Tri-Nation Series
The ODI series was postponed in June 2020 due to the COVID-19 pandemic.

West Indies in England

The tour was postponed in April 2020 due to the COVID-19 pandemic. In June 2020, a revised schedule was confirmed. The Test matches took place at the Rose Bowl and Old Trafford in July 2020.

New Zealand in West Indies
The tour was postponed due to a fixture clash following the rescheduling of the West Indies tour to England.

Pakistan in Ireland
The tour was postponed in May 2020 due to the COVID-19 pandemic, with the fixtures rescheduled for the following year.

South Africa in West Indies and United States
The tour was postponed due to a fixture clash following the rescheduling of the West Indies tour to England, and was rescheduled for June 2021.

West Indies in Netherlands
The tour was postponed in April 2020 due to the COVID-19 pandemic, and was rescheduled for June 2022.

Ireland in England

Afghanistan in Zimbabwe
The tour was postponed in August 2020 due to the COVID-19 pandemic.

August

2020 Uganda Cricket World Cup Challenge League B

The List A series was postponed in June 2020 due to the COVID-19 pandemic.

Pakistan in England

Zimbabwe in Australia

The tour was postponed in June 2020 due to the COVID-19 pandemic.

New Zealand in Bangladesh

The tour was postponed in June 2020 due to the COVID-19 pandemic.

India in South Africa

The tour was postponed in August 2020 due to a fixture clash with the rescheduled 2020 Indian Premier League.

India in Zimbabwe
The tour was postponed in June 2020 due to the COVID-19 pandemic.

India in Sri Lanka
The tour was postponed in June 2020 due to the COVID-19 pandemic, and was rescheduled for July 2021.

September

South Africa women in England
The tour was postponed in August 2020 due to the COVID-19 pandemic.

Australia in England

Netherlands in Zimbabwe

The tour was postponed in August 2020 due to the COVID-19 pandemic.

West Indies women in England

See also
 Associate international cricket in 2020
 Impact of the COVID-19 pandemic on cricket

Notes

References

2020 in cricket